Michelle Calkins is a Canadian former synchronized swimmer, world champion and coach.

Career
Calkins trained with the Calgary Aquabelles.  In her first international competition she won a silver medal in the team event at the 1973 World Aquatics Championships in Belgrade, Yugoslavia. She was also a member of the silver medal team at the 1975 Pan American Games. Her most notable successes came with her partner Helen Vanderburg. At the Pan Pacific Championships in Mexico City the pair won Gold for the first time. They won Gold again at the Canadian Aquatic Championships in 1978 in Berlin and were the first Canadian duo to earn gold medals in that event. Calkins retired from competition in 1978.

Coaching
After she retired from her swimming career she began coaching with the Calgary Aquabelles winning gold with her first team at the Canada Winter Games in Brandon, Manitoba.  Michelle coached with the Aquabelle Club winning numerous Junior National team titles and Junior coach of the year 1984; continuing under the guidance of Olympic coach Debbie Muir, Michelle coached the Senior Aquabelle team to three National Championships over the span of her career. She began serving as a coach for the Canadian National Team in synchronized swimming in 1988, winning gold in solo, duet and team at the Loano Cup in Italy 1992 and Canada's last silver medal in Team at the World Championships in Rome in 1994. Michelle was honored Nationally by the Coaching Association of Canada for her success at the World Championships. Calkins was the personal coach of 5 Canadian team Olympians: Reed, Fonteyne, Clark, Chan and Tatham. She has since retired from coaching.

Titles
1973 Belgrade, Yugoslavia - World Championships - silver in team
1975 Mexico City - Pan American Games - silver in team
1976 Nagoya Japan - Pan Pacific Championships - silver in team
1977 Mexico City - Pan Pacific Championships - gold in duet, silver team
1978 Berlin Germany - World Championships - gold in duet

Honours
Calkins and Vanderburg won the Elaine Tanner award as the best young female athletes in Canada in 1977. Michelle and Helen were inducted to the Canadian Swimming Hall of Fame in 1979.  She was inducted into the Alberta Sports Hall of Fame in 1980, and became a member of the International Swimming Hall of Fame in 2001.

See also
 List of members of the International Swimming Hall of Fame

References

External links
 International Swimming Hall of Fame profile
 Alberta Sports Hall of Fame profile

Living people
Alberta Sports Hall of Fame inductees
Canadian synchronized swimmers
Pan American Games medalists in synchronized swimming
Pan American Games silver medalists for Canada
Sportspeople from Alberta
Synchronized swimmers at the 1975 Pan American Games
Year of birth missing (living people)
Medalists at the 1975 Pan American Games